Torsten Palm (born 23 July 1947 in Kristinehamn) is a former racing driver from Sweden.

Racing career
The younger brother of famous rally co-driver Gunnar Palm, Torsten competed as a co-driver as well. In 1967 he came second in the Swedish Rally with Simo Lampinen.

Palm competed internationally in formula racing and rallies. He made his debut in Formula 3 in 1969 and came second to Ronnie Peterson in the Swedish Championship that year, before winning the Championship in 1970 and 1971. During the European Formula 2 Championship in 1973 he set the record on the raceway in Karlskoga, Sweden, in front of 40,000 spectators. Palm finished third in his Surtees, with Peterson in fifth place. Nobody beat the record before the circuit was rebuilt in the end of the decade. Sponsored by Polar Caravans he made his Formula 1 debut in a Hesketh in 1975. In Monaco he failed to qualify for the race. In Anderstorp, Sweden, he qualified for the race and finished 10th.

From 1993-2003 he ran a car dealership, Torsten Palm Bil AB, which was the representative for Ferrari for three years.

Complete Formula One results
(key)

References

Swedish racing drivers
Swedish Formula One drivers
European Formula Two Championship drivers
1947 births
Living people
People from Kristinehamn
Sportspeople from Värmland County